The HP CalcPad series were calculators sold by Hewlett-Packard.

HP CalcPad 100 

The keypad layout of the HP CalcPad 100 (NW226AA) is similar to the standard PC 10-key numeric pad. The keypad includes basic mathematical functions: addition, subtraction, multiplication, and division. It is compatible with Microsoft Windows, Apple MacOS and other operating systems that support the USB protocol.

Has four hotkeys to access: Microsoft Excel, Word, clear desktop, HP CalcPad calculator.

The CalcPad 100 has two additional USB 2.0 ports and may be used as a hub for any USB-compatible PC peripherals.

HP CalcPad 200 

The keypad layout of the HP CalcPad 200 (NW227AA) is similar to the standard PC 10-key numeric pad. The keypad includes basic mathematical functions: addition, subtraction, multiplication, division, percent, constant and 00 key. It is compatible with Microsoft Windows, Apple MacOS and other operating systems that support the USB protocol.

Has four hotkeys to access: Microsoft Excel, Word, clear desktop, HP CalcPad calculator.

Unlike the CalcPad 100, the CalcPad 200 can work as a standalone basic business calculator, with a 12 digit LCD display, powered by a solar cell with battery back-up and automatic shut off.

The CalcPad 200 has two additional USB 2.0 ports and may be used as a hub for any USB-compatible PC peripherals.

See also 
 List of HP calculators

External links 
 HP CalcPad 100 datasheet
 HP CalcPad 100 guia do usuário
 HP CalcPad 200 datasheet
 HP CalcPad 200 user guide

CalcPad series